Itaewon Class is a 2020 South Korean television series starring Park Seo-joon, Kim Da-mi, Yoo Jae-myung, and Kwon Nara. Based on the webtoon of the same name, it is the first series to be produced by the film distribution company Showbox. It aired on JTBC in Korea from January 31 to March 21, 2020, and is streaming worldwide on Netflix. The series won Best Drama Series at the 25th Asian Television Awards.

Synopsis 

Due to an accident which killed his father, Park Sae-ro-yi (Park Seo-joon) attempted to kill Jang Geun-won (Ahn Bo-hyun), the son of Jangga Group's founder, Jang Dae-hee (Yoo Jae-myung). He was jailed and the woman he loved, Oh Soo-ah (Kwon Na-ra), was offered a university scholarship by Jang Dae-hee and later became the Strategic Planning Head of Jangga Group.

After his release from prison, Park Sae-ro-yi opens Danbam in Itaewon. He wants to be successful and seeks revenge towards Jangga Group. However, he is not too smart at managing his business. He then meets Jo Yi-seo (Kim Da-mi).

Cast and characters

Main
 Park Seo-joon as Park Sae-ro-yi
 Proprietor of DanBam, a bar-restaurant in Itaewon. In his youth, Sae-ro-yi gets expelled from high school for punching CEO Jang's son Geun-won, who was bullying a classmate, and becomes bereaved when his father is killed by Geun-won's reckless driving. Angered by the loss, he attacks Geun-won, leading to his three-year imprisonment. Following his father's steps, Sae-ro-yi opens his bar-restaurant DanBam in Itaewon seven years after he is released from jail, with the aim of expanding it into a franchise and defeating CEO Jang's food company Jangga Group. In 2020, he becomes the CEO of his company IC Group.
 Kim Da-mi as Jo Yi-seo
 Choi Myung-bin as young Jo Yi-seo
 Manager of Sae-Ro-Yi's bar-restaurant DanBam. Yi-seo is a multi-talented and intelligent girl with an IQ of 162. She moved from New York to continue her studies in South Korea. She is also famous on social media as a power blogger and social media internet celebrity. Having a crush on Sae-Ro-yi, she offers to become the manager of DanBam. Her lack of empathy and callous behavior has many people believe she is a sociopath, but she does end up caring for her DanBam coworkers. She especially has a breakthrough with Hyeon-Yi after initially criticizing her cooking and believing her transgender identity would impede DanBam’s business. Despite being declined by Sae-ro-yi, Yi-seo remains by his side as DanBam’s manager. In 2020, Yi-seo becomes the CFO of Sae-ro-yi's company IC Group. Eventually, Saeroyi realizes his feelings for Yi-Seo and he confesses his love for her. 
 Yoo Jae-myung as Jang Dae-hee
 CEO of food company Jangga Group. CEO Jang is a self-made man who, despite the odds, succeeds in turning his once small bar into a large franchise company. In his years of experience leading Jangga, he develops a strong belief in power and authority as a means to achieve his goals. He meets Sae-ro-yi when the latter has a fight with his son Geun-won in high school and expects him to kneel as a submission of his power. However, Saeroryi always resisted kneeling and made his life harder for it. In 2020, he is diagnosed with pancreatic cancer and doesn't have much long to live. Unfortunately, his illegal activities under Jangga was exposed and ruined his company. Despite kneeling before Sae-Ro-Yi for help, Sae-Ro-Yi absorbed Jangga into his company, leaving Dae-Hee with nothing.
 Kwon Nara as Oh Soo-ah
 Ok Ye-rin as young Oh Soo-ah
 Head of the strategic planning team in Jangga Group; Sae-ro-yi's former classmate and first love. Abandoned by her mother, Soo-ah grew up in an orphanage and became close with Sae-ro-yi's father Sung-yeol. She becomes acquainted with Sae-ro-yi, who has a crush on her. After Sung-yeol's death, she receives a scholarship offer from Jangga Group and soon becomes an employee in the company. Though passionate about her work, she is torn between her allegiance to Jangga and her love for Sae-ro-yi. Due to their conflicts of interests, the two would hold a long term emotional relationship, but never a true romantic one. Eventually, Soo-ah realizes Saeroyi's feelings have changed and the two remain as friends. She later became a whistle blower to the authorities on the crimes that Jangga have committed in the past during her time in the company and later starts her own restaurant.

Supporting

DanBam staff

 Kim Dong-hee as Jang Geun-soo
CEO Jang's second and illegitimate son; Yi-seo's classmate and staff member at DanBam. Geun-soo has been bullied by his older brother Geun-won and he never felt loved by his parents. Upon turning 17, he left the Jang family and lived by himself from then on. After inconveniencing DanBam in an incident, he decides to work for Sae-ro-yi, whom he considers to be a "real adult." He has a crush on Yi-seo. However, after leaving DanBam, Geun-soo chooses to work at his father's company to become the successor for Jangga Group, and gradually became ruthless towards his former DanBam colleagues due to his thirst to prove himself and win Yi-seo's affections. In 2020, Geun-soo is the director of Jangga Group, and he eventually reconciles with the DanBam staff after realising the error of his ways.
 Ryu Kyung-soo as Choi Seung-kwon
Staff member at DanBam. Seung-kwon was Sae-ro-yi's cellmate in prison. Believing that he cannot better his life outside of jail, he became a gangster under a gang leader upon his release. Seven years later, he meets Sae-ro-yi who, to his surprise, had already opened a bar in Itaewon. Deeply respecting Sae-ro-yi and his way to live a better life, he gives up being a gangster and starts working at DanBam. In 2020, he becomes one of the directors of Sae-ro-yi's company IC Group.
 Lee Joo-young as Ma Hyeon-yi
DanBam's chief cook. Hyun-yi first met Sae-ro-yi in a factory where the two formerly worked, years before the start of DanBam. She was hired as DanBam's cook when Sae-ro-yi liked the food she once cooked for him back then. Hyun-yi is a transgender woman and has been saving money for her sex reassignment surgery. In 2020, she becomes one of the directors of Sae-ro-yi's company IC Group.
 Chris Lyon as Kim To-ni
DamBam's Guinean-Korean part-timer. Even though he cannot speak and understand English, To-ni is fluent in speaking Korean, owing to his Korean father and his one-year residence in South Korea, and French, the language he speaks in Guinea. Eventually, he is able to learn and speak a satisfactory amount of English. He also reunited with his Korean grandmother (a sponsor and investor of DanBam), who acknowledges him as her grandchild.

Jangga Group

 Ahn Bo-hyun as Jang Geun-won
CEO Jang's first son and heir to Jangga Group. Geun-won was Sae-ro-yi and Soo-ah's classmate in high school who frequently bullied their classmate Ho-jin. He caused the vehicular accident that killed Sae-ro-yi's father Sung-yeol. Years later when he attempts to recruit Yi-seo into Jangga, his confession to the crime is recorded by her and he attacks her until Sae-ro-yi intervenes and gets him arrested. Dae-hee deserts Geun-won by admitting his son's crimes during his apology meeting and Geun-won was sentenced to seven years' imprisonment. In 2020, he is released on parole after serving four years out of his prison term and therefore, alongside Kim Hee-hoon and his gang, Geun-won plans to get revenge on Yi-seo by kidnapping both her and his brother, though he ultimately failed and he was sentenced to incarceration once again.
 Kim Hye-eun as Kang Min-jung
Jangga Group's executive director, who secretly plots to usurp CEO Jang. She is a close friend of Park Sung-yeol, father of Park Sae-ro-yi, which made her willing to ally with Sae-ro-yi against Dae-hee.
 Hong Seo-joon as Mr. Kim
Jang Dae-hee's right-hand man. He is very loyal to his boss.
 Yoo Da-mi as Kim Sun-ae
Jang Dae-hee's secretary and Kang Min-jung’s spy.

Others

 Lee David as Lee Ho-jin
Sae-royi's investment manager. Ho-jin was Sae-ro-yi, Soo-ah and Geun-won's classmate in high school. After years of bearing the constant bullying from Geun-won, he gets into a prestigious college and takes up business administration. He partners up with Sae-ro-yi in taking revenge against Geun-won and CEO Jang. In 2020, he becomes the financial manager for Sae-ro-yi's company IC Group. In one of the flashback scene when he visited Sae-ro-yi in prison; he listed Sae-ro-yi as a friend.
 Kim Yeo-jin as Jo Jeong-min
Yi-seo's mother, who disapproves of Yi-seo quitting college and working at Danbam. She also did not have a good impression of Sae-ro-yi at first but eventually consents to her daughter's relationship with him.
 Yoon Kyung-ho as Oh Byeong-heon
Detective in charge of Geun-won's hit-and-run case which he was pressured to cover up. He quit his job after the case and is now one of Sae-ro-yi's suppliers.
 Choi Yu-ri as Oh Hye-won
Oh Byeong-heon's daughter, who is oblivious to Sae-ro-yi's connection with her father.
 Cha Mi-kyung as Kim Soon-rye
To-ni's Korean paternal grandmother. After her son's death, she deeply regrets disapproving of her son's marriage to a Guinean woman (To-ni's mother), as it caused her son to run away. She is a loan shark who offers her services to Sae-ro-yi when he moves his bar to a new location. She was also one of the first supporters of Jangga.
 Won Hyun-joon as Kim Hee-hoon
Sae-ro-yi's former cellmate and a leader of a group of gangsters. Though initially cordial to both Sae-ro-yi and Choi Seung-kwon, he later allies himself with Jang Geun-won to kidnap Yi-seo and Geun-soo.
 Han Hye-ji as Kook Bok-hee
Yi-seo and Geun-soo's former classmate. Her bullying activities were exposed after Yi-seo recorded her performing the act, which publicly humiliated her. After running into Yi-seo months later, she attempted to assault her for ruining her reputation alongside her friends, only to be beaten down by Yi-seo.

Special appearances

 Ahn Sol-bin as Sae-ro-yi's classmate (Ep. 1)
A student who had a crush on Sae-ro-yi and had her confession rejected by him.
 Son Hyun-joo as Park Sung-yeol (Ep. 1–2 & 15)
Sae-ro-yi's father and former employee in Jangga Group. He taught Sae-ro-yi to stick to his beliefs and to fight for what is right. He resigned from Jangga in defense of Sae-ro-yi's deed of stopping Geun-won's bullying. He died in an accident caused by Geun-won.
 Hong Seok-cheon as himself (Ep. 2, 4, 9 & 16)
Soo-ah's acquaintance and TV celebrity. He works at a bar that Sae-ro-yi visits twice (years before and after opening DanBam). They meet again after Sae-ro-yi moves the location of his bar.
 Yoon Park as Kim Sung-hyun (Ep. 3)
Geun-soo's elder friend who goes to DanBam with Geun-soo and Yi-seo where the two get caught for underage drinking.
 Cha Chung-hwa as Bureau Chief's wife (Ep. 3)
Mother of Bok-hee, whose behavior was exposed online by Yi-seo.
 Im So-eun as Bok-hee's friend (Ep. 5)
One of Bok-hee's friends. She, alongside Bok-hee and her friend, attempted to assault Yi-seo after running into each other months after high school graduation.
 Jung Yoo-min as Seo Jeong-In (Ep. 6)
The daughter of the CEO of a pharmaceutical company and Geun-won's blind date. The blind date was arranged by Geun-won's father.
 Seo Eun-soo as part-time job applicant (Ep. 6)
Sae-ro-yi's acquaintance. She applied for the job that was eventually offered to Kim To-ni. Yi-seo rejected her application out of jealousy of her and Sae-ro-yi's close relationship.
 Kim Il-joong as himself (Ep. 11 & 13)
Host of the cooking program show The Best Pub.
 Jeon No-min as Do Joong-myung (Ep. 11–12)
CEO of the investment firm Jungmyung Holdings. He offers Sae-ro-yi to franchise DanBam. Later he was one of the sleeper agent for Dae Hee to thwart Sae-ro-yi plan to franchise DanBam. 
 Lee Jun-hyeok as Park Joon-gi (Ep. 11–13)
A contestant on The Best Pub. He represents Jangga Group as the head cook and comes in second to Hyun-yi during the final. He subsequently gets fired.
 Park Bo-gum as Handsome Chef (Ep. 16)
The new chef at Soo-ah's restaurant in which Hong Seok-cheon invested after he passed the job interview.

Production
The first script reading took place in August 2019 at JTBC Building in Sangam-dong, Seoul, South Korea.

The drama serves as a reunion between Park Seo-Joon and Yoo Jae-myung who previously worked together in the KBS2 drama Hwarang: The Poet Warrior Youth.

Original soundtrack

Itaewon Class: Original Soundtrack
The drama's soundtrack is compiled in a four-part album released on March 20, 2020. CDs 1 and 2 contain the drama's theme songs and their instrumental versions, while CDs 3 and 4 contain the drama's musical score. The following lists are the track listings for the online streaming version of the album.

Part 1

Part 2

Part 3

Part 4

Part 5

Part 6

Part 7

Part 8

Part 9

Part 10

Part 11

Part 12

Part 13

Chart performance

Reception
Itaewon Class''' final episode recorded a 16.548% nationwide audience share, making it the third-highest viewership rating in JTBC, and the 12th highest-rated drama in Korean cable television history, just slightly under Love (ft. Marriage and Divorce). The drama was also praised for its realistic portrayal of subjects such as prejudice and discrimination against foreigners, ex-convicts and  LGBT people, as well as the portrayal of misbehaviours by chaebols.Time Magazine included Itaewon Class on its list of "The 10 Best Korean Dramas to Watch on Netflix".  Forbes included the series on its list of "The 13 Best Korean Dramas Of 2020". The Guardian  mentioned the drama in an article recommending Korean dramas to watch after finishing Squid Game. Google Trends revealed that the series was the #1 most-searched drama/entertainment program of 2020, and the fourth most searched domestic search term of 2020 in South Korea.

Awards and nominations

Viewership

International adaptations
A Japanese drama adaptation, titled as Roppongi Class'', was aired on July 7, 2022 via TV Asahi.

A British, Chinese, French, German, Indian and Turkish adaptations are in development.

Notes

References

External links
  
 
 

2020 South Korean television series debuts
2020 South Korean television series endings
JTBC television dramas
Korean-language Netflix exclusive international distribution programming
South Korean LGBT-related television shows
Television shows based on South Korean webtoons
Television shows set in Seoul
Transgender-related television shows
Television series by Zium Content
Itaewon